This is a list of space objects and features which were named after Russian people:

Minor planets
 232 Russia

Comets
 67P/Churyumov–Gerasimenko

Interstellar comets
 2I/Borisov - after Gennadiy Borisov

Asteroids
 1004 Belopolskya - after Aristarkh Belopolsky
 1007 Pawlowia - after Ivan P. Pavlov
 1028 Lydina
 1059 Mussorgskia
 1074 Beljawskya
 1075 Helina
 1094 Siberia
 1099 Figneria
 1113 Katja
 1118 Hanskya
 1121 Natascha
 1129 Neujmina
 1147 Stavropolis
 1149 Volga
 1158 Luda
 1167 Dubiago
 1189 Terentia
 1190 Pelagia
 1204 Renzia
 1206 Numerowia
 1210 Morosovia
 2227 Otto Struve - after Otto Struve
 2325 Chernykh

Features on asteroids
 Mathilde
 Kuznetsk crater - after a Russian coal basin

Moons

The Moon
 Andronov (crater) - after Aleksandr Andronov
 Artamonov (crater) and Catena Artamonov - after Nikolay Artamonov
 Beketov (crater)
 Belopol'skiy (crater)
 Belyaev (crater)
 Boris (crater) and Rupes Boris - after Boris (a common Russian masculine name)
 Butlerov (crater)
 Catena Yuri
 Dorsa Andrusov - after Nicolai Ivanovich Andrusov
 Dorsa Smirnov - after Sergei Sergeevich Smirnov
 Dorsa Tetyaev - after Mikhail Tetyaev
 Evdokimov (crater)
 Fedorov (crater)
 Feoktistov (crater)
 Fesenkov (lunar crater)
 Firsov (crater)
 Gavrilov (crater)
 Gagarin (crater) - after Yuri Gagarin
 Kleymenov (crater)
 Komarov (crater)
 Konstantinov (crater)
 Kramarov (crater)
 Krasnov (crater)
 Krylov (crater)
 Kurchatov (crater)
 Leonov (crater)
 Lomonosov (lunar crater)
 Lyapunov (crater)
 Maksutov (crater)
 Mare Moscoviense - after Moscow
 Markov (crater)
 Mechnikov (crater)
 Mons Usov - after Mikhail Usov
 Mons Vinogradov - after Alexander Pavlovich Vinogradov
 Morozov (crater)
 Numerov (crater)
 Orlov (crater)
 Petrov (crater)
 Polzunov (crater)
 Popov (crater)
 Pavlov (crater) - after Ivan P. Pavlov
 Razumov (crater)
 Sechenov (crater)
 Sharonov (lunar crater)
 Shatalov (crater)
 Steklov (crater)
 Stoletov (crater)
 Tikhomirov (crater)
 Tikhov (lunar crater)
 Titov (crater)
 Vavilov (crater)
 Volkov (crater)
 Yablochkov (crater)
 Yangel' - after Mikhail Yangel

Io
 Podja Patera - after Podja (Evenk people of Russia and China)
 Purgine Patera - after Purgine (Mordvin people of Russia)
 Tol-Ava Patera - after Tol-Ava (Mordvin people of Russia)

Callisto
 Numi-Torum crater - after Numi-Torum (Mansi people of Russia)

Titan
 Buyan Insula - after Buyan, a rocky island in Russian folk tales located on the south shore of Baltic Sea
 Avacha Sinus - after Avacha Bay in Kamchatka, Russia

Charon
 Sadko crater - after the adventurer who traveled to the bottom of the sea in the medieval Russian epic Bylina

Planets

Mercury
 Aksakov (crater)
 Balanchine (crater)
 Barma (crater)
 Belinskij (crater)
 Bunin crater
 Chaikovskij (crater)
 Chekhov (crater)
 Derzhavin (crater)
 Dostoevskij (crater)
 Erté (crater)
 Fet (crater)
 Glinka (crater)
 Gogol (crater)
 Kandinsky (crater)
 Lermontov (crater)
 Mussorgskij (crater)
 Nabokov (crater)
 Petipa (crater)
 Popova (crater)
 Prokofiev (crater)
 Pushkin crater
 Rachmaninoff (crater)
 Repin crater
 Roerich (crater)
 Rublev crater
 Stravinsky (crater)
 Surikov crater
 Tolstoj (crater)
 Turgenev crater

Venus
 Akhmatova crater - Anna Akhmatova, Russian poet
 Andreianova crater - Elena Andreianova, Russian ballerina
 Barsova crater - Valeria Barsova, Soviet singer
 Bugoslavskaya crater - Yevgenia Bugoslavskaya, Soviet astronomer

Mars
 Alexey Tolstoy crater
 Barabashov (crater)
 Barsukov crater
 Belyov crater
 Fesenkov (Martian crater)
 Kasimov crater
 Kirsanov crater
 Koval'sky (crater)
 Krishtofovich crater
 Lomonosov (Martian crater)
 Martynov (crater)
 Moroz crater
 Okhotsk crater
 Olenek crater
 Olom crater
 Ostrov crater
 Palana crater
 Reutov crater
 Revda crater
 Ruza crater
 Rynok crater
 Sabo crater
 Sangar crater
 Satka crater
 Sevi crater
 Sharonov (Martian crater)
 Sian crater
 Sinda crater
 Sokol crater
 Sulak crater
 Tem' crater
 Tikhonravov (crater)
 Tokko crater
 Tokma crater
 Tolon crater
 Tomari crater
 Trud crater
 Tumul crater
 Tura crater
 Turma crater
 Udzha crater
 Ulu crater
 Ulya crater
 Utan crater
 Volgograd crater
 Vol'sk crater
 Yar crater
 Zilair (crater)
 Žulanka crater

Dwarf planets

Pluto
 Safronov crater - after Viktor Safronov, Russian astronomer

Ceres
 Kupalo crater - after Russian (Slavic) god of vegetation and of the harvest
 Baltay Catena - after Mordvin (Mordvinian) agricultural festival
 Gerber Catena - after Udmurt (Volga-Ural region, Russia) agricultural festival

Exoplanets 
 Teberda

See also 
 List of cosmonauts

Sources
 Meanings of minor planet names: 1–1000
 Lists of geological features of the Solar System
 List of craters in the Solar System
 List of people with craters of the Moon named after them
 List of minor planets named after people
 List of astronomical objects named after people
 List of galaxies named after people
 Stars named after people

Space program of Russia
Astronomical nomenclature by nation